The Ennepe is a river, and a left tributary of the Volme in Northern Sauerland, Germany.

It gave its name to the town Ennepetal, and the district Ennepe-Ruhr-Kreis.

Course of River
The Ennepe begins in the Märkischer Kreis southeast of Halver, at 422 m above sea level, and continues to the Ennepetalsperre (reservoir, 307 m above sea level).

The river flows through Ennepetal, Gevelsberg, and the western boroughs of Hagen.

It flows into the Volme, near Hagen Central Station (elevation: 99 m above sea level).

Parts of the river are canalized.

Flora and fauna
The Ennepe provides habitat for numerous animal and plant types.

Among are fishes, the grey heron, neophyte plants, and Orange Jewelweed (Impatiens capensis, in Hagen).

Industrial use
In the pre-industrial age, several mills were built alongside the river.

In the 19th and 20th centuries, several small iron plants were operated there.

References

Rivers of North Rhine-Westphalia
Rivers of Germany